The 2006 J.League Cup Final was the 14th final of the J.League Cup competition. The final was played at National Stadium in Tokyo on 3 November 2006. JEF United Chiba won the championship.

Match details

See also
2006 J.League Cup

References

J.League Cup
2006 in Japanese football
JEF United Chiba matches
Kashima Antlers matches